Yalta is a city in the Crimean peninsula.

Yalta may also refer to:

Places

Ukraine
Yalta, Donetsk Oblast, urban-type settlement in Pershotravnevyi Raion of Donetsk Oblast
Yalta (village), Donetsk OBlast, village in Velyka Novosilka Raion of Donetsk Oblast

Other uses
 The Yalta Conference of 1945, in which the UK, US and Soviet Union discussed Europe's reorganisation after the end of World War II.
 Yalta, export version of the Zaporozhets car
 Yalta Hotel Complex, hotel in Yalta, Crimea
 Yalta (nightclub), nightclub in Sofia, Bulgaria
 Yalta Rally, rally in Yalta, Crimea
 Jalta, Jalta, famous Croatian musical
 Yalta, a character mentioned several times in the Babylonian Talmud